For the U.S. state, see: Hawaii.

Hawaiia is a genus of very small air-breathing land snails, terrestrial pulmonate gastropod mollusks or micromollusks in the family Pristilomatidae.

Species
Species within this genus include:
 Hawaiia minuscula (Binney, 1840)

References

Pristilomatidae